Abdul Sattar Abu Risha – Sheikh Abdul Sattar Eftikhan al-Rishawi الشيخ عبد الستار افتيخان الريشاوي – (born 1972 – 13 September 2007) was a high-profile Iraqi tribal sheikh of the Abu-Risha tribe. He was the leader of an alliance of Iraqi Sunni Arab tribes that opposed al-Qaeda in Iraq.

Life
Abu Risha was the grandson of a tribal leader in the Iraqi revolt against the British occupying forces in 1920 and the son of a commander in the Anglo-Iraqi War in 1941. Little is known about Abu Risha's life prior to the Iraq War, albeit he reportedly ran a construction and import-export business with offices in Amman in Jordan and Dubai in the UAE. According to The Washington Post, "he was called a warlord and a highway bandit, an oil smuggler and an opportunist". Many of the Awakening leaders are believed to have at least tacitly supported the Iraqi insurgency, though Sattar claimed he never did.

During the early part of the insurgency following the 2003 invasion of Iraq, as al-Qaeda's fighters tightened their grip on Ramadi, it is reported that they became increasingly repressive and challenged the tribal leaders' power. Soon they were kidnapping and beheading tribal Sunnis as part of a campaign of extortion and intimidation. Abdul Sattar's own father and two brothers were killed by al-Qaeda. During the late summer of 2006, he began enlisting his fellow sheikhs in Sahawat al-Anbar and encouraging members of his tribe to join the local police force. The U.S. forces under Lt. Col. Tony Deane encouraged Sattar and provided security for the initial meetings of the Al Anbar tribal meetings at Sattar's compound in western Ramadi; these early meetings were the beginning of what grew into the Anbar Salvation Council by the fall of 2006; in March 2007 the Council counted 41 clans from Anbar province. The development led to a sharp reduction of violence in the province and forced many al-Qaeda fighters to flee to other regions of Iraq.

Assassination
Abu Risha was assassinated on 13 September 2007, along with three of his guards by an improvised explosive device planted on the road near the gate of his house in Ramadi.<ref name=Bomb>Bomb Kills a Key Sunni Ally of U.S., The Washington Post, September 14, 2007</ref> Al-Qaeda took responsibility for the attack and several dozen people were arrested in connection with the killing, including the head of his own security detail.

The sheikh's funeral attracted about 1,500 mourners, including Iraq's national security adviser Mowaffak al-Rubaie, Interior Minister Jawad Jawad Bulani, Defense Minister General Qadir Obeidi and Lieutenant-General Raymond Odierno, second in command of U.S. forces in Iraq, and sparked vows of revenge. After Abu Risha's death, his brother, Sheik Ahmed Abu Risha, was selected to take over leadership of the Anbar Salvation Council by the tribal leaders of the province.

See also
 Al-Qaeda in Iraq
 Sons of Iraq

References

External links

 The man who might save Iraq, Asia Times'', May 5, 2007
 Obituary: Abdul Sattar Abu Risha, BBC News, September 14, 2007

1972 births
2007 deaths
2007 murders in Iraq
Assassinated Iraqi politicians
Deaths by improvised explosive device in Iraq
Iraqi Sunni Muslims
People murdered in Iraq
Place of birth missing
20th-century Iraqi businesspeople